Michael Paulo Lingbanan Avelino (born May 13, 1988) is a Filipino actor, singer, model and a movie producer. Regarded as the "Prince of Philippine Teleserye", he is best known in television series such as Walang Hanggan (2012), Bridges of Love (2015), The General's Daughter (2020) he made a breakthrough role as Gregorio del Pilar in the Philippine war epic Heneral Luna (2015), which he reprised in a titular role for its sequel, Goyo: Ang Batang Heneral (2018).

Early life
Avelino was born on May 13, 1988, in Baguio, Philippines, as Michael Paulo Lingbanan Avelino. He is the son of Roberto Puigcerver Avelino, an influential Spanish-Filipino from Calbayog, Western Samar, and Jennilyn Lingbanan. He is a grandson of Baltazar Avelino, former governor of Samar, and a great-grandson of former Senate President Jose Avelino. He has three siblings, Honey, Gabriel, and Angela. He is the second oldest of his siblings.

Career

2006–10: Early career
Avelino began his career after appearing on the GMA Network reality talent show StarStruck in 2006. After being eliminated from the show, he signed an exclusive contract with GMA and played various supporting roles for the network. He appeared in the Black Jewel in the Palace episode of Magic Kamison in 2007 and had minor roles in two series, Sine Novela and Zaido: Pulis Pangkalawakan. The StarStruck 4 cast were then given a show titled Boys Nxt Door, an award-winning youth-oriented situation comedy, in which Avelino played Peter. This series premiered in 2007 and ran for 31 episodes.

In 2008, he appeared in a supporting role in Babangon Ako't Dudurugin Kita, a remake of the 1989 movie of the same title redeveloped by Don Michael Perez and produced by GMA Network. He had roles in an afternoon series, Gaano Kadalas ang Minsan, and in a primetime series, Luna Mystika. He also made his debut on film, in Desperadas 2, a Metro Manila Film Festival entry from Regal Films.

In 2009, Avelino started a regular stint on GMA's variety show SOP Rules and landed major roles in two series starring Kris Bernal and Aljur Abrenica, fellow Starstruck 4 alumni: Dapat Ka Bang Mahalin? and All My Life. He was also cast as Robert in a GMA Films-VIVA Films project, Patient X and as Pepe in a Filipino action fantasy film, Ang Panday. In 2010, he appeared in a supporting role in a primetime series Ilumina, and replaced JC de Vera for a lead role in the fantasy series Panday Kids. His last performance for GMA Network was a lead role in the afternoon fantasy-drama Alakdana, with Louise delos Reyes and Alden Richards.

2011–12: ABS-CBN, first starring roles
In mid-2011, Avelino transferred to ABS-CBN, known as the Kapamilya network. He told ABS-CBN News that he wanted to get out of his comfort zone and, at the same time, reinvent himself as an actor. His first project as a Kapamilya actor was in a lead role alongside Lovi Poe on Regal Films' Aswang. He also participated in Yesterday, Today, Tomorrow, an entry to the 2011 Metro Manila Film Festival. He appeared for the first time in an ABS-CBN show through a guest role in 100 Days to Heaven, where he took the role of a rich executive named Teddy Ledesma, alongside veteran actor Phillip Salvador. He also appeared in Wansapanataym, Maalaala Mo Kaya and Ikaw Ay Pag-Ibig.

Avelino played the role of a bisexual in the 2011 Cinemalaya film Ang Sayaw ng Dalawang Kaliwang Paa alongside Rocco Nacino, winning Best Actor at the Gawad Urian Awards, his first award. He characterized the script of the film as "really different", offering the potential for an interesting role. In 2012, Avelino played Nathan Montenegro in the hit primetime series Walang Hanggan, alongside Coco Martin and Julia Montes. He commented in an interview that he learned a lot from watching Martin act. He co-starred in the "Lost Command" episode of the horror trilogy Shake, Rattle & Roll 14 produced by Regal Films, an entry in the 2012 Metro Manila Film Festival.

In parallel with his acting career, Avelino began to work on musical projects, beginning with a single, a cover of Restless Heart's "When She Cries".  His first album, Paulo Avelino, was released by Universal Records on October 1, 2012. It comprises six covers of OPM classic hits, plus instrumental versions of each track. Avelino released a music video for his second single, a cover of Alamid's "Your Love".

2013–present: Recent projects

2013: Avelino's drama series roles included the pre-primetime series Kahit Konting Pagtingin, with Angeline Quinto and Sam Milby; two Maalaala Mo Kaya episodes: "Notbook" and "Mask"; and the family drama series Honesto, where he reunited with his Walang Hanggan co-stars Melissa Ricks and Noni Buencamino.

His film roles included two independent films for Cinemalaya: Debosyon, directed by Alvin Yapan, and Sana Dati, directed by Jerrold Tarog. He starred with Lovi Poe and Jennylyn Mercado in a highly charged erotic-drama romantic comedy film directed by Joel Lamangan, The Bride and the Lover.  He also appeared on a romantic-comedy film directed by Chris Martinez titled Status: It's Complicated, with Jake Cuenca, Solenn Heussaff, Maja Salvador, and veteran comedian Eugene Domingo. The movie is a remake of the 1979 classic comedy film Salawahan, directed by Ishmael Bernal.

In the 2013 Metro Manila Film Festival, Avelino appeared in two entries: a lead role on Star Cinema's horror film Pagpag and a cameo in Kimmy Dora: The Quantum of Kiyeme.

2014: Avelino starred as part of the main cast of Sana Bukas pa ang Kahapon, with Bea Alonzo and Albert Martinez. He also starred in Give Love on Christmas, it is a Philippine daytime drama anthology series produced by Dreamscape Entertainment Television with KC Concepcion.

2015: Avelino starred in the soap opera Bridges of Love, with Jericho Rosales and Maja Salvador, and was cast as Simon Evangelista in On the Wings of Love, with James Reid and Nadine Lustre. He also top billed two movies Heneral Luna (lit. 'General Luna') a 2015 Filipino historical biopic film and Resureksyon (lit. Resurrection') is a 2015 Filipino horror dramafilm directed by Alfonso Torre III

In 2016, He starred in FPJ's Ang Probinsyano (lit. FPJ's The Provincial Man; abbreviated as FPJAP and internationally known as Brothers) a 2015 Philippine action drama television series under ABS-CBN Entertainment as one of the guest Antagoinist. He also top bill the Movie The Unmarried Wife, a 2016 Filipino romance drama film starring Angelica Panganiban, Dingdong Dantes, and himself.

2017: Avelino starred with ABS-CBN newcomer Ritz Azul in the television series The Promise of Forever. He also starred in two movies, I'm Drunk, I Love You, a 2017 Filipino romantic comedy independent film directed by JP Habac, and written by Habac and Giancarlo Abrahan with Maja Salvador and Ang Larawan, internationally released as The Portrait(Japanese: ある肖像画, Hepburn: Aru Shōzō-ga), a 2017 Philippine musical film directed by Loy Arcenas.

2018: Avelino starred in an afternoon series, Asintado as Gael Ojeda and in the primetime soap opera The General's Daughter as Franco Segismundo. He also top billed the two movies, Kasal a 2018 Filipino romance drama film starring Bea Alonzo, Derek Ramsay and Paulo Avelino. The film was directed by Ruel S. Bayani and produced by Star Cinema and Goyo: The Boy General (Filipino: Goyo: Ang Batang Heneral), or simply Goyo, is a 2018 Philippine epic war drama film.

2020:  Avelino starred in Walang Hanggang Paalam (International title: Irreplaceable / transl. Never Ending Goodbye) is a 2020 Philippine romance drama television series broadcast by Kapamilya Channel. Directed by Emmanuel Q. Palo and Darnel Joy R. Villaflor, it stars Paulo Avelino, Zanjoe Marudo, Arci Muñoz, Angelica Panganiban and JC Santos. And a Movie Fan Girl a 2020 Philippine coming of age film starring Charlie Dizon and Paulo Avelino. It is written and directed by Antoinette Jadaone.

2021: Avelino starred with ABS-CBN newcomer Janine Gutierrez in the primetime soap opera series, Marry Me, Marry You as Andrei.

2022: Avelino starred in Marry Me Marry you Season 2 as Andrei, Flower of Evil''''', a Philippine drama television series loosely based on the 2020 South Korean drama series of the same title. And a Movie with ABS-CBN newcomer Janine Gutierrez, Ngayon Kaya.

In the present, he is filming his new teleserye with Kim Chiu and Maricel Soriano titled Linlang, to be seen and watched on the first half of 2023.

Personal life
Paulo Avelino came from the prominent family in Baguio, Philippines. He is the son of Roberto Puigcerver Avelino, an influential Spanish-Filipino from Calbayog, Western Samar, and Jennilyn Lingbanan. He is a grandson of Baltazar Avelino, former governor of Samar, and a great-grandson of former Senate President Jose Avelino. He has three siblings, Honey, Gabriel, and Angela. He is the second oldest of his siblings. Paulo has a son with LJ Reyes.

Filmography

Television

Movies

Music videos

Discography

Awards and nominations

References

External links
 

1988 births
Living people
Filipino male film actors
Filipino male models
Filipino male pop singers
Filipino male television actors
Filipino people of Spanish descent
Male actors from Metro Manila
People from Baguio
Saint Louis University (Philippines) alumni
Participants in Philippine reality television series
StarStruck (Philippine TV series) participants
GMA Network personalities
ABS-CBN personalities
Star Magic
Universal Records (Philippines) artists
21st-century Filipino male actors
21st-century Filipino male singers